Astragalus leucolobus is a species of milkvetch known by the common names Bear Valley milkvetch and Bear Valley woollypod.

Distribution
It is endemic to the mountain ranges of southern California, where it is known from scattered occurrences in the San Gabriel, San Bernardino, and San Jacinto Mountains. It is a plant of mountain forest and woodland.

Description
This is a small perennial herb forming a low clump of spreading stems and woolly leaves. The stems are less than 7 centimeters in length and bear leaves made up of many oval-shaped, pointed leaflets.

An inflorescence of 5 to 13 flowers rises above the clump of herbage. Each flower is pinkish purple and is between one and two centimeters long. The fruit is a densely woolly white legume pod with a bent tip.

References

External links
Astragalus leucolobus - Photo gallery
Jepson Manual Treatment - Astragalus leucolobus
USDA Plants Profile; Astragalus leucolobus

leucolobus
Endemic flora of California
~
~